William Peryn (died 1558) was an English Roman Catholic priest and Dominican monk who in the reign of Mary I became  prior of the short-lived  Priory of St Bartholomew's, Smithfield, London.

Life
Peryn was educated at Blackfriars in Oxford and there are records of him being there in 1529 and 1531, the year in which he was ordained. He went to London and was a preacher strongly against heresy, and a chaplain to Sir John Port. Soon after Henry VIII’s Royal Act of Supremacy, 1534, he went into exile, but in 1543returned to England, when he applied for the degree of Bachelor of Theology at Oxford. He became a chantrist at St Paul's and early in 1547 preached in favour of images in religious services.

With the accession of the Protestant Edward VI in 1547, Peryn went into exile again, spending several years in Louvain before returning to England in 1553 upon the accession of the Roman Catholic Mary I. That year, he was appointed prior of the Dominican house at St Bartholomew's in Smithfield, London, the first religious house founded by Mary. On 8 February 1556 Peryn is recorded by the diarist Henry Machyn as preaching at Paul's Cross.

The three godly sermons were originally preached at St Anthony's Hospital in London and are dedicated to Edmund Bonner, Bishop of London. Peryn borrowed heavily from Bishop of Rochester John Fisher's , and in a preface he explains why he has published the sermons:

...

Peryn's  was dedicated to two exiled English nuns: Katherine Palmer, abbess of the nuns at Syon in Isleworth, and Dorothy Clement, a Poor Clare at Louvain and the daughter of Sir Thomas More's adopted daughter Margaret Clement. It was also based on Nicolaus van Esch's Exercitia theologiae mysticae. This work by Peryn was to have a long readership among English recusants and was much treasured by Margaret Clitheroe. It would be republished by a Catholic press of Caen in 1598.

Peryn died in 1558 and was buried in St Bartholomew's on 22 August, at the high altar.

Notes

References
L. E. C. Wooding, ‘Peryn,  William  (d. 1558)’, Oxford Dictionary of National Biography, Oxford University Press,  2004, accessed 20 Feb 2012.

External links
http://en.wikisource.org/wiki/Peryn,_William_%28DNB00%29

1558 deaths
16th-century English Roman Catholic theologians
Year of birth unknown